The 1994 Minnesota gubernatorial election took place on November 8, 1994, in the midst of that year's Republican Revolution. Incumbent Republican Arne Carlson easily won re-election over his main challenger Democrat–Farmer–Labor State Senate John Marty.

To date, this is the most recent gubernatorial election in which Hennepin and Ramsey counties voted for the Republican candidate.

Republican Party
While incumbent Arne Carlson was popular in the state, he was not popular with rank-and-file Republicans, who viewed his victory in 1990 as an accident, as he was chosen as a replacement nominee shortly before the general election. Carlson, who was pro-choice and in favor of extending civil rights to homosexuals, was seen as too moderate by delegates to the GOP state convention, who ultimately chose former State Representative Allen Quist, a staunch conservative, as their nominee. Ultimately, though, Carlson easily defeated Quist in the state primary, putting him on the ballot for November.

Candidates
 Arne Carlson, incumbent Governor
 Allen Quist, former State Representative
Running mate: Doug McFarland, Hamline University professor

Primary results

Democratic Party
At the DFL convention, Marty received the party endorsement, beating back a strong challenge by three opponents, one of whom Mike Freeman, son of a popular former Governor withdrew, but Marty still faced a strong challenge from former Minneapolis Chief of Police Tony Bouza. Bouza faded, however, when it was revealed that he supported severe restrictions on handguns. Marty ultimately won a narrow victory in the primary over former Commerce Commissioner Mike Hatch, who lost his second consecutive gubernatorial primary.

Candidates
 Tony Bouza, former Minneapolis Chief of Police
 Mike Hatch, former Commissioner of Commerce and candidate for Governor in 1990
 John Marty, State Senator
 Richard T. Van Bergen
 Michael O. Freeman, Hennepin County Attorney, son of ex-Governor Orville Freeman (Withdrew after DFL Convention)

Primary results

General election

Campaign
The 1994 election nationwide was noted for a GOP wave of election victories.  In Minnesota, that wave wasn't as evident as half of the statewide elections went for each party.  With the GOP winning the Governor and U.S. Senator positions and the DFL winning the State Attorney General, Secretary of State, State Auditor and State Treasurer positions.  As well, the Minnesota State House remained in DFL control by a 72-64 margin.  The results of the gubernatorial general election were: Arne Carlson 1,094,165, John Marty 589,344, Will Shetterly 20,785, Jon Hillson 3,022, Eric Arthur Olson 15,467, Leslie Davis 4,611.

Candidates
 Arne Carlson (R), incumbent Governor
 John Marty (DFL), State Senator
 Will Shetterly (Grassroots), fantasy and comic book writer
 Eric Olson (L)
 Leslie Davis (Nutritional Rights), activist and perennial candidate
 John Hillson (SWP)

Polling

Results

External links
https://web.archive.org/web/20060425113929/http://www.sos.state.mn.us/docs/mn_leg_man_06_chapt7.pdf

References

Minnesota
Gubernatorial
1994